Black angelfish may refer to:

 Black angelfish, Chaetodontoplus niger
 New Zealand black angelfish, Parma alboscapularis
 Keyhole angelfish, Centropyge tibicen
 Freshwater angelfish, one of the breeds of Pterophyllum scalare